Zohra Aziza Baccouche ('Dr. Z') was an American physicist and science filmmaker. She was an American Association for the Advancement of Science Mass Media Science and Engineering fellow at CNN and founder and CEO of media company Aziza Productions. Declared legally blind at the age of eight, Baccouche lost her sight due to a brain tumor at eight years old. She died in 2021.

Early life 
Baccouche was born to an African-American mother and Tunisian father on November 25, 1976 and brought up in Tunisia. She developed a brain tumor as a child which caused a disorder called hydrocephalus when she was eight years old.  Hydrocephalus blocks cerebral fluid in the brain and creates pressure within the ventricles. In Baccouche's case, that pressure damaged her optic nerve causing her to lose all but 9% of her vision by the age of eight.

Education 
Baccouche was the first blind person to study physics at the College of William & Mary, graduating in 1995 with a Bachelor of Science. Her undergraduate advisor suggested that because she was blind she should she not study physics. Baccouche earned her master's degree from Hampton University in 1998 and her PhD in theoretical nuclear physics from the University of Maryland, College Park, in 2002. Her dissertation entitled "Phenomenology of Isoscalar Heavy Baryons" focused on heavy baryons.

Career 
As part of an American Association for the Advancement of Science Mass Media Fellowship in 1998, Baccouche joined CNN in Atlanta and was appointed the special science correspondent of the Washington Bureau. In 2000, she established Aziza Productions, a media production company that works with nonprofit organizations to make films that raise awareness about Black or disabled scientists.

After completing her PhD, Baccouche continued her career in science communication. In addition to continuing to work at Aziza Productions, she became a science correspondent for Evening Exchange with Kojo Nnamdi on Howard University Television. Baccouche was involved with initiatives to increase the number of African-American women studying physics. She worked as a science media producer and was a frequent contributor to the National Society of Black Physicists (NSBP) conferences.  In 2020 Baccouche authored a memoir titled "Seeking Vision" chronicling her life from when she was declared legally blind at the age of eight until her fifth brain surgery. Shortly thereafter, she developed dementia and passed away from complications from her brain tumor.

Awards and distinctions 
Baccouche was honored with a HerStory Award at the Women's Federation for World Peace USA National Assembly in 2013.

References 

1976 births
2021 deaths
American blind people
American women physicists
African-American scientists
American people of Tunisian descent
Hampton University alumni
University of Maryland, College Park alumni
20th-century African-American people
20th-century African-American women
21st-century African-American people
21st-century African-American women
African-American physicists
African-American women scientists
Scientists with disabilities